Sawang Arom is a district (amphoe) in the northern part of Uthai Thani province, northern Thailand.

History
This area was originally called Ban Sawang Chaeng Sabai Chai. In a Thai-Burmese war of Ayutthaya era, the troops began fighting in the Lat Yao district area at night and finished at the village in the morning. To commemorate this battle the government renamed the village Sawang Arom in 1961. 

The Sawang Arom minor district (king amphoe) was established in 1960 as a subordinate of Thap Than district by splitting off four sub-districts from Thap Than. It was upgraded to a full district in 1963.

Geography
Neighboring districts are (from the east clockwise) Thap Than, Lan Sak of Uthai Thani Province, Lat Yao and Krok Phra of Nakhon Sawan province.

Administration
The district is divided into five sub-districts (tambons), which are further subdivided into 64 villages (mubans). Sawang Arom is a sub-district municipality (thesaban tambon) which covers parts of tambon Sawang Arom. There are a further five tambon administrative organizations (TAO).

References

External links
amphoe.com (Thai)

Sawang Arom